The Toldi trilogy is an epic poem trilogy by the Hungarian poet János Arany, inspired by the legendary Miklós Toldi, who served in the Hungarian King Louis the Great's army in the 13th century. The trilogy recounted the medieval stories of Toldi as the king's champion.

The trilogy comprises:

 Toldi (1846)
 Toldi szerelme (Toldi's Love) (1879)
 Toldi estéje (Toldi's Night) (1848)

The trilogy was adapted as an animated film under the title Heroic Times in the 1980s, directed by József Gémes for the Pannonia Film Studio.

The first part of the trilogy was written for an organization led by Károly Kisfaludy.

External links 
 Toldi, Toldi’s Love, and Toldi’s Eve (prose translation by Anton N. Nyerges)
 Toldi: cantos 1–7 and cantos 8–12 (verse translation by Watson Kirkconnell in collaboration with Tivadar Edl). In: Canadian–American Review of Hungarian Studies
 Preview of the bilingual translation of Toldi by Ottó Tomschey

Hungarian poetry
Epic poems in Hungarian
Literary trilogies